Southern Peninsula is an administrative unit and part of Reykjanesskagi (pronounced ), or Reykjanes Peninsula, a region in southwest Iceland. It was named after Reykjanes, the southwestern tip of Reykjanesskagi.

The region has a population of 27,829 (2020) and is one of the more densely populated parts of the island. The administrative centre is Keflavík, which had 7,000 residents when it merged with the nearby town of Njarðvík and Hafnir in 1995 to create Reykjanesbær, which is the largest settlement outside the Greater Reykjavík area; in 2018 the region had a population of 17,805. The region is the location of Keflavík International Airport, the major point of entry for Iceland. Some fishing towns, such as Grindavík, Njarðvík and Sandgerði are situated on the peninsula.

The peninsula is marked by active volcanism under its surface and large lava fields, allowing little vegetation. There are numerous hot springs in the southern half of the peninsula, around the Kleifarvatn lake and the Krýsuvík geothermal area. There is a geothermal power station at Svartsengi. Near the power station a luxury spa and pool area has been installed using the hot and mineralized water coming down from the power station; it is known as the "Blue Lagoon" (Bláa Lónið).

It was built in 2002 and previously named Leif the Lucky bridge in honor of Icelandic explorer Leif Eriksson who traveled from Europe to America nearly 500 years before Christopher Columbus.

A great deal of volcanic unrest was occurring in the Reykjanes Peninsula in 2020 and into 2021, after nearly 800 years of inactivity. After the eruption of the Fagradalsfjall volcano started on 19 March 2021, National Geographic's experts predicted that this "may mark the start of decades of volcanic activity". The eruption was small, leading to a prediction that this volcano was unlikely to threaten "any population centers".

Reykjanes volcanic system

The Reykjanes Volcanic System is one of the volcanic systems on Reykjanes Peninsula in Southwest Iceland, where the Mid-Atlantic Ridge rises above sea level. It is part of Reykjanes Volcanic Belt like the 3-6 (depending on author) other volcanic systems on Reykjanes Peninsula.). A volcanic system on the peninsula of Reykjanes consists of (volcanic and tectonic) fissures and faults directed mostly NE-SW. Only Hengill, if this volcano is also taken into account here, has an additional central volcano. The Reykjanes volcanic system shows lava fields and postglacial basaltic crater rows. The small shield volcanoes are mostly not counted.

The submarine Reykjanes Ridge volcanic zone is contiguous but is considered only for a small part integrated into the Reykjanes volcanic system, which is the westernmost volcanic system closely spaced en-echelon fissure systems extending across the Reykjanes Peninsula. The highest of the system's multiple vents is 230 metres (754 ft). Dredging operations resulted in recovery of basaltic rocks of probable Holocene age. Most of the subaerial part of the system is covered by Holocene-age lava fields. During the 13th century, the last subaerial eruptions occurred along the Reykjanes fissure system. Tephra deposits from Holocene eruptions have been preserved on the Reykjanes Peninsula.

Gallery

See also
 Krýsuvík (volcanic system)
 Brennisteinsfjöll

References

External links

Reykjanes 
Reykjanes South Peninsula Private Tour 
Photography 
http://isafold.de/reykjavegur01/img_sveifluhals.htm
http://isafold.de/reykjavegur01/img_pass.htm
http://isafold.de/reykjavegur01/img_keilir.htm
http://isafold.de/reykjavegur01/img_dampf.htm
http://icelandiscool.com/photos/islandpictures.htm

 
Peninsulas of Iceland
Lava fields